Gaye Su Akyol (born 30 January 1985) is a Turkish singer, painter and anthropologist.

Biography 
Akyol's father is the painter Muzaffer Akyol; her mother passed away in 2014. She graduated from the anthropology department of Yeditepe University in 2007. Before her solo career, she also worked on 'Mai', 'Toz ve Toz' and Seni Görmem İmkansız alongside Tuğçe Şenoğul.

In 2017, she composed a few songs for the soundtrack of Red Istanbul a film directed by Ferzan Özpetek.

Discography 
Studio albums
 Develerle Yaşıyorum (2014)
 Hologram İmparatorluğu (2016)
 İstikrarlı Hayal Hakikattir (2018)
 Anadolu Ejderi (2022)

EPs
 Yort Savul: İSYAN MANİFESTOSU! (2020)

Awards and recognition 
Gaye Su Akyol received Best Artist award at Songlines Music Awards 2019. Gaye Su Akyol is also considered as an important figure for the LGBTQI+ community and featured on the cover of Gzone Magazine. In 2020, she appeared in trans biographical documentary film called İris, directed by Volkan Güleryüz.

References

External links 
 Official website
 
 

1985 births
Living people
Singers from Istanbul
Turkish singer-songwriters
21st-century Turkish singers